Here are events and incumbents from 1815 in Canada.

Incumbents
Monarch: George III

Federal government
Parliament of Lower Canada: 8th (starting January 21)
Parliament of Upper Canada: 6th

Governors
Governor of the Canadas: Robert Milnes
Governor of New Brunswick: George Prévost
Governor of Nova Scotia: John Coape Sherbrooke
Commodore-Governor of Newfoundland: Richard Goodwin Keats
Governor of Prince Edward Island: Charles Douglass Smith

Events
 The Great Migration from Europe begins.
 January – Unaware of the Treaty of Ghent, General Andrew Jackson (1767–1845) wins the Battle of New Orleans.
 February 9 – A bill to give the speaker a salary of 1,000 pounds is read.
 February 18 – The United States ratifies treaties signed in December 1814.
 March 25 – Governor George Prevost informs Parliament that then-prince regent George IV has ordered him to England to answer charges of the naval commander.
 March – Parliament allocates 25,000 pounds for a canal from Montreal to Lachine.

Births
January 10 – John A. Macdonald, politician and 1st Prime Minister of Canada, Born in Glasgow, Scotland. (died 1891)
 March 7: Thomas Wood, Member of the Legislative Council of Quebec for Bedford, died in office, 1898
June 19 – Cornelius Krieghoff, painter (died 1872)
 September 18 – Joseph Duquet, notary in Lower Canada, executed in 1838
 October 15 – Pierre Antoine Deblois, Senator for La Salle, Quebec, died in office, 1898

References 

 
Canada
Years of the 19th century in Canada
1815 in North America